is a railway station  in the village of  Matsukawa, Nagano Prefecture, Japan, operated by East Japan Railway Company (JR East).

Lines
Kita-Hosono Station is served by the Ōito Line and is 23.8 kilometers from the terminus of the line at Matsumoto Station.

Station layout
The station consists of one ground-level side platform serving a single bi-directional track. The station is unattended.

History
It was renamed to its present name on 1 June 1937. With the privatization of Japanese National Railways (JNR) on 1 April 1987, the station came under the control of JR East.

Surrounding area

See also
 List of railway stations in Japan

References

External links

 JR East station information 

Railway stations in Nagano Prefecture
Ōito Line
Railway stations in Japan opened in 1930
Stations of East Japan Railway Company
Matsukawa, Nagano (Kitaazumi)